Aigul is a Turkic feminine given name. Notable people with the name include:

Aigul is a Turkic feminine given name
Aigul Gareeva (born 2001), Russian racing cyclist
Aigul Jeenbekova (born 1968), First Lady of Kyrgyzstan 

Turkic feminine given names